The 1931 Brown Bears football team represented Brown University as an independent during the 1931 college football season. Led by sixth-year head coach Tuss McLaughry, the Bears compiled a record of 7–3.

Schedule

References

Brown
Brown Bears football seasons
Brown Bears football